This is a list of the members of the Dewan Negara (Senate) of the Fourth Parliament of Malaysia.

Elected by the State Legislative Assembly

Nominated by the Prime Minister and appointed by the Yang di-Pertuan Agong

Death in office
 S. P. Seenivasagam (d. 4 July 1975)
 Athi Nahappan (d. 9 May 1976)
 Ngau Ken Lock (d. 8 March 1978)
 Mohamed Said Abu Bakar (d. 16 April 1978)
 Chan Kwong Hon (d. 29 May 1978)

Footnotes

References

Malaysian parliaments
Lists of members of the Dewan Negara